Small Favor is the tenth book in The Dresden Files, Jim Butcher's continuing series about wizard detective Harry Blackstone Copperfield Dresden. The book stayed on the New York Times Best Seller list for 3 weeks following its release, attaining the number 2 spot during its first week. Small Favor is available as an eBook and an audio CD.

Plot summary
One year after the events in White Night, Dresden is confronted by Queen Mab calling in one of the favors owed her by Harry: that he be her "Emissary", and protect John Marcone. Despite repeated attacks by gruffs - soldiers in service of Summer - he tracks Marcone's movements across the city. He finds Hendricks and Ms. Gard at one of Marcone's safe houses, having survived an attack by the Denarians, whom he learns have abducted Marcone. Ms. Gard formally requests that the White Council file an objection to the abduction of one signatory of the Unseelie Accords by another. Luccio, captain of the Wardens, agrees to bring in the Archive (a twelve-year-old girl Harry named "Ivy") as a neutral party.

Dresden meets Murphy at McAnally's. After he updates her, a huge gruff enters to challenge Dresden to a duel, and is saved by Murphy invoking her duties as a law officer. While Thomas is distracting the gruffs, Dresden confronts Ms. Gard and convinces her to tell him of a case of blood samples kept in a locker at Union Station. Harry and Michael are attacked at Union station by Winter minions and the elder gruff but recover the samples. Grievously wounded, the elder gruff leaves, warning Dresden that the eldest brother gruff will kill him. Harry also meets up with Ivy the Archive, her bodyguard Kincaid, and Warden Captain Luccio, who retreat to the safety of Dresden's warded apartment.

The Archive schedules a meeting between Dresden and Nicodemus at the Shedd Aquarium. During the negotiations, Dresden realizes it's a charade to kidnap the Archive. Dresden and Ivy team up to fight off the Denarians. Even though they kill almost every Denarian, Ivy is captured. Nicodemus plans to coerce Ivy into accepting a blackened denarius. In desperation, Dresden offers Nicodemus all the denarii that the Knights of the Cross have collected and a Sword of the Cross, as Ivy being corrupted would be an unstoppable force for evil. Before Dresden's meeting with Nicodemus, Michael asks Dresden about his blasting rod. Dresden realizes he lost his rod after his meeting with Queen Mab, but he is not sure how or why, and concludes he has been mentally manipulated.

At the exchange on an island in lake Michigan, the Denarians predictably renege, but Dresden and Sanya manage to free Marcone and the Archive. Ms. Gard arrives with a rescue copter, but the surviving Denarians return and badly injure Michael. Dresden is abandoned on the island, hunted by the Denarians and their mercenaries, and is eventually cornered by the Eldest Gruff. The conflicted gruff reveals that he has been compelled to attack Dresden as long as they are both on the battlefield. Dresden invokes his boon from Summer for a freshly made doughnut. The gruff remarks that the request might take just enough time for Harry to depart the island safely and says the Summer Court's hunt will end when Dresden re-enters the Chicago city limits.

Dresden attempts to escape on Rosanna's boat, but is attacked by Nicodemus and Deirdre. He barely manages to drive them off after Thomas and Murphy return with another boat and Murphy draws Fidelacchius - a Sword of the Cross Dresden brought with him. They return to the mainland, and Dresden rushes to the hospital to find Michael, still in surgery. In the hospital chapel, Dresden has a heated discussion with a janitor, who explains that God has a plan for us all and vanishes, leaving behind a worn copy of The Two Towers with a marked section. Queen Mab appears in the chapel. She is pleased that the Watchman has enhanced Dresden's potential. She returns his blasting rod and reveals that he would have been killed earlier if he had used it to rescue his friends.

Dresden visits Ivy and Kincaid at Murphy's house. Later, Sanya gives Michael's sword, Amoracchius, to Dresden with the instructions to pass it on, when the time is right. Michael survived the surgery, but might not make a complete recovery. Dresden and Anastasia Luccio end the day with a pleasant dinner and a delightful evening.

Introduced characters

 Akariel: one of the Fallen, defeated by Harry and Thomas.
 Gruffs: servants of Summer and the origin of the Three Billy Goats Gruff story, complete with a reputation for killing trolls, with the heads, fur, and legs of goats but the torso and arms of a man. They increase in size, much as the storybook version, until the Eldest Gruff, a small being of massive magical power.
 Hobs: servants of Winter, harmed by light, able to call Myrk, a magical light-blocking effect.
 Magog: one of the Fallen. Sanya had dropped the coin into a Venetian canal, but he obtained a new host. Nameless host is killed by the Eldest Gruff; Harry safely recovered his coin. Magog is the physically strongest of the Fallen and Tessa's thug.
 McKullen: one of the Denarians.
 Ordiel: one of the Fallen.
 Rosanna: Tessa's second and one of the Fallen. She is also Sanya's former Patron among the Denarians.
 Tarsiel: one of the Fallen.
 Tessa Imariel: known also as Polonius Lartessa, she is the  second oldest of the Fallen, wife of Nicodemus and a sorceress. Harry calls her Mantis Girl.
 Thorned Namshiel: Fallen, responsible for the attack on Arctis Tor; Harry called him Spinyboy. He is the most magically knowledgeable of the Fallen. His coin was missing at the end of the book.
 Uriel: an Archangel, Mab refers to him as the Watchman. He has taken an interest in Harry.
 Urumviel: one of the Fallen.
 Varthiel: one of the Fallen.

External links
 
 The first four chapters of the book may be found on the author's official site.

References

2008 American novels
American fantasy novels
Novels by Jim Butcher
The Dresden Files
Low fantasy novels
Urban fantasy novels
Roc Books books